Rodolfo Hinostroza (October 27, 1941 – November 1, 2016) was a Peruvian poet, writer, journalist, food critic and astrologer. He was born in Lima.

Early life
In 1962 he left Peru with a scholarship to study Philosophy and English Literature at the University San Cristobal of La Habana. There, he wrote his first poetry book "Consejero del Lobo" published by "Editorial El Puente" in 1964. Frustrated by the way the Castro régime was using the scholarship students to his political ends, he managed to leave in 1964, after a series of intense experiences on the island, and returned to Lima.

Journalism
He worked as a script writer in the Peruvian TV for some time and then started working in journalism, among others, and joined the reputed magazine Caretas.

In 1968, he married French born Nadine Caillière, and traveled back with her to Paris, where he lived until 1984. He arrived in Paris in the midst of the 1968 student turmoil which would have a direct impact on his poetry. He worked in several places such as the ORTF Radio, in publishing group Gallimard, as a translator for Spanish publishers like Tusquets (for whom he also translated future Nobel Prize Le Clézio, among others) and Barral. In 1972 he won the international poetry award "Maldoror", with his poetry book "Contranatura", organized by Barral Editores (Barcelona, Spain) with Octavio Paz at the head of the jury. Besides, he also worked with French/Peruvian tour operator "Uniclam" who entrusted him to write several tourist guides: Mexico (1976), Bolivia (1978) and Peru (1981), all published in French. In 1979, he published "Aprendizaje de la limpieza", a result of his seven-year psychoanalytical experience which he had started in Lima and finished in 1975 in Paris.

Gastronomy
In 1984, he returned to Peru where he met Dutch translator Ingrid Sipkes with whom he formed a family and has three children: Cayetana (1985), Lorenzo (1989) and Ruy (1991). He resumed his journalistic activities at Caretas, specializing this time in gastronomy. After 15 years of a solid French gastronomic background and pleasantly surprised by the Peruvian bounties he discovered at his return in Peru, he has been a key driver of spreading awareness at national level of the virtues of Peruvian cuisine. From 1984 to 2006, he wrote many articles about the upcoming cuisine and Lima restaurants in newspaper La Republica, Caretas and his own gourmet restaurant guide Anfitrion, preceding the present Peruvian gastronomic revolution. He also had his own gastronomic/astrological radio program at Radio 1160 for a year and a half, together with his sister, the Peruvian cuisine chef teaching at Cordon Bleu Peru, Gloria Hinostroza.  He crowned his gastronomic period publishing a luxury Peruvian cuisine book "Primicias de Cocina Peruana"  (Everest, 2005) including -besides some of the best Peruvian recipes with full color photographs- a very illustrative 100 page essay about the history of Peruvian cuisine, which he claims, started in 1492, when Columbus actually arrived on South American soil looking for exotic spices... The book was awarded three international prizes (Spanish National Gastronomic Academy in 2005 -2nd place-, Gourmand Award 2006, Latin Book Award NY 2006 -2nd place-).

Writing and poetry
In 1987, he was awarded the first place in Juan Rulfo International Short Story Award for "El Benefactor". In 1994 he published "Fata Morgana" and in 1997 he won the national "Arte Nuevo" prize for his play "Cuadrando el Círculo", a comedy which traveled throughout Peru and had an audience of over 75.000 viewers. In 2001, he published his short stories book "Cuentos de Extremo Occidente" and in 2005, after a long poetic silence, "Memorial de Casa Grande". In June 2006, "Extensión de la Palabra" was published by Mexican group Aldus, an anthology of his poetry, theater and short stories. In 2007, Visor Editores from Spain published his "Poesía Completa". In 2009, he was granted the prestigious Guggenheim Fellowship. In July 2012, Tribal Editores published "Pararrayos de Dios", a compendium of short chronicles where he describes a series of juicy personal experiences with some reputed deceased Peruvian poet-colleagues. In November 2013, he was awarded the National Award of Culture 2013, Category Career, by the Peruvian Ministry of Culture and PetroPeru. Hinostroza died at the age of 75 on November 1, 2016, leaving 7 unpublished books.

Awards
 1972 Maldoror Poetry Award, Barcelona, Spain, "Contranatura"
 1987 First prize, Juan Rulfo International Short Story Award, Paris, France, "The Benefactor"
 1997 Arte Nuevo Theatre Award, Lima, Peru, "Squaring the circle"
 2006 Gourmand Award Best Foreign Language Book, Peking, China, "Primicias de Cocina Peruana"
 2007 National Gastronomic Academy, 2nd prize, Madrid, Spain, "Primicias de Cocina Peruana"
 2007 Latino Book Awards, 2nd prize, New York, USA, "Primicias de Cocina Peruana"
 2009 Guggenheim Fellowship, Washington, DC, USA 
 2013 National Award of Culture 2013, Category Career, Lima, Peru

Poetry
"PROBLEMAS CON BRABANCIO"; "LOS HUESOS DE MI PADRE", Universidad de Chile
 Consejero del Lobo, La Habana: Fondo de Cultura Popular, 1965
 Contranatura, Barcelona: Barral Editores, 1971
 Poemas Reunidos, Mosca Azul Editores, 1986

Novels
 Aprendizaje de la Limpieza, Barcelona: Tusquets, 1978
 Fata Morgana, ASA Ediciones, 1994
Cuentos de extremo occidente, Fondo Editorial PUCP, 2002,

Plays
 Apocalipsis de una noche de verano, Instituto Nacional de Cultura, 1988

Non-fiction
 El Sistema astrológico, Barcelona: Barral, 1973, 
 Guía de México (Paris, 1977)
 Guía del Perú  (París, 1986)
 Guía de Bolivia (París, 1989).

Anthologies
"Contra Natura", 	Antología de la poesía erótica española e hispanoamericana, Editor Pedro Provencio, EDAF, 2003, 
Poesía latinoamericana: antología bilingüe, Editor Mario Laventi, Epsilon Editores, 1998,

References

1941 births
2016 deaths
20th-century Peruvian poets
Writers from Lima
Peruvian male poets
Astrological writers
Peruvian translators
French–Spanish translators
20th-century translators